Yeldos Smetov (Eldos Bahtybaiūly Smetov; born 9 September 1992) is a Kazakh judoka who competes in the under 60 kg weight division. He won gold medals at the 2014 Asian Games and 2015 World Judo Championships, and a silver medal at the 2016 Olympics.  He won the bronze medal at the 2020 Olympics held in Tokyo, Japan.

Smetov won a gold and a bronze medal at the World Cup among youth, in 2010 and 2011, respectively. Since 2012 he was part of the adult national team. He won a bronze in the 2013 Asian Judo Championships  in Bangkok, a silver at a stage Gran Prix in Samsun, a stage of the European Cup to Tbilisi, and gold at an open European Cup in judo in Warsaw. Smetov's first coach was Akhmet Zhumagulov.

References

External links

 
 
 
 

Kazakhstani male judoka
Living people
1992 births
People from Taraz
Judoka at the 2014 Asian Games
Judoka at the 2018 Asian Games
Asian Games gold medalists for Kazakhstan
Asian Games silver medalists for Kazakhstan
Asian Games medalists in judo
Medalists at the 2014 Asian Games
Judoka at the 2016 Summer Olympics
Olympic judoka of Kazakhstan
Olympic silver medalists for Kazakhstan
Olympic medalists in judo
Medalists at the 2016 Summer Olympics
Judoka at the 2020 Summer Olympics
Olympic bronze medalists for Kazakhstan
Medalists at the 2020 Summer Olympics